was a village headman in Hiro, Kii Province (current Hirogawa, Wakayama) noted for his role in saving villagers from a tsunami during the 1854 Ansei-Nankai earthquake. In the Meiji period, he became an entrepreneur, the seventh owner of Yamasa, the noted soy sauce brewer, philanthropist and politician.

Biography

Early history
Hamaguchi Goryō was born to a cadet branch of the Hamaguchi family in what is now Yuasa, Wakayama. The Hamaguchi family were soy sauce brewers and merchants, and had operations in both Shimosa and Kii Province. At the age of 12, he was adopted by the main family, which was based at what is now Chōshi, Chiba, where he relocated. In October 1839, he married a daughter of Ikenaga Umetaro in Yuasa at the age of 20. After staying in Hiro-mura for another six months, he returned to Chōshi via Edo in the following spring. By the time, he already mastered techniques of martial arts, especially kendo. In addition, he was very good at composing and writing poems.

As a youth, he was interested in western medicine and natural history and during the Bakumatsu period, he volunteered to the Tokugawa shogunate to be sent abroad for training, but was not accepted. At the age of 30, he returned to his native Kii Province and in 1852, opened a private academy for the training of commoner youths in trades. This academy was the forerunner of the current Wakayama Prefectural Taikyu High School. In 1854, he inherited the position of family head as the 7th generation Hamaguchi Goryō.

The Ansei-Nankai earthquake and aftermath
In the hours after the 1854 Ansei-Nankai earthquake, Hamaguchi Goryō recognized the danger to the village posed by a tsunami, and urged the villagers to evacuate to a nearby hill containing the Hiro Hachiman Shrine. Since it was night, he ordered that stacked sheaves of rice, which were drying after the recent harvest, to be set on fire to guide the villagers to safety. As a result, more than 90 percent of the villagers escaped the tsunami. The story was quickly popularized by 
 Inamura no Hi: The Burning Rice Fields by Tsunezo Nakai (translated and published in English by Sara Cone Bryant) and Lafcadio Hearn's Gleanings in Buddha-Fields (1897), with some elaborations, and the account of his heroism became required reading in Japanese textbooks.

After the disaster, Hamaguchi Goryō worked to restore the damaged bridge and built a huge seawall, the Hirokawa Embankment over a four-year period. This  large-scale civil engineering work was intended not only for  disaster prevention, but was also to provide employment for the villagers who had lost everything due to the tsunami. The cost of the 600 meters long, 20 meters wide and 5 meters high embankment was the equivalent of 4667 ryō and was paid for by Hamaguchi and earned him the sobriquet of "a living god". Some 88 years later, this embankment protected Hirogawa from a tsunami from the 1946 Nankai earthquake.

Political career
In 1868, despite his commoner status, Hamaguchi was appointed a magistrate (bugyō) of Kishū Domain and a professor  at the domain academy. He was asked to lead efforts to reform and modernize the domain's economy. In 1880, he became the first chairman of the Wakayama Prefectural Assembly. In preparation for the opening of the Imperial Diet, he formed the Kikuni Doyukai a local proto-political party. In 1885, he went on a world trip, which had been his dream since his youth. He died in New York, in the United States. His funeral was held on June 15, 1885, in Hirogawa and more than 4,000 people gathered to pay their final respects.

Timeline

See also
Lafcadio Hearn
Yamasa
The Fire of Rice Sheaves

References

 Hearn, Lafcadio Gleanings in Buddha-Fields: Studies of Hand and Soul in the Far East (1897)
 Ladd, George Trumbull Rare Days in Japan (1910)
 Ladd, George Trumbull In Korea with Marquis Ito (1908)
 Bryant, Sara Cone The Burning Rice Fields (1963)
 Hodges, Margaret Moore The Wave (1964)

External links
 Yamasa Corporation
 Yamasa Corporation USA
 "Inamura no Hi" no Yakata
 Speech by Prime Minister Junichiro Koizumi

1820 births
1885 deaths
Tsunami
Meiji Restoration
Japanese businesspeople
Japanese philanthropists
People from Wakayama Prefecture